= Fortuna Weekend of Champions =

Fortuna Víkend šampionů
- Founded: 2007
- Region: Czech Republic (UEFA)
- Teams: 6-8
- Current champions: (Czech Republic) FC Slovan Liberec
- Most championships: (Czech Republic) Bohemians Prague (2 titles)

Fortuna Weekend of Champions (Czech: Fortuna Víkend šampionů) was an annual winter international football indoor tournament held from 2007 in O2 Arena, Prague, Czech Republic. In 2011, games were also held at Slovnaft Arena in Bratislava. The tournament was held in the month of January and organized by the gambling and sports betting company Fortuna. The tournament involved 4 or 6 teams: two or three from the Czech Republic, and two or three of Slovakia.

The tournament was played on artificial grass on the pitch and on the playing futsal field. Goal dimensions were 2 x 3 m. The teams played 2x15 minute matches. Participants are divided into two four-man (or according to the three-member cast) groups, where everyone plays with each one match. Teams that finished in last place, they play with each other on the final location for the 4th, the winners and their pursuit in the group play each other semifinal. The losers play for the third place and the winners advance to the final. The first three teams awarded to financial bonus.

== Finals ==
Year	Champion	Runners-up	Third place	Fourth place
2007	(Czech Republic) Bohemians 1905	(Slovakia) MFK Ružomberok	(Czech Republic) FK Mladá Boleslav	(Czech Republic) FC Slovan Liberec
2008	(Czech Republic) FK Viktoria Žižkov	(Czech Republic) AC Sparta Prague	(Slovakia) MŠK Žilina	(Czech Republic) Bohemians 1905
2009	(Czech Republic) Bohemians 1905	(Czech Republic) FK Mladá Boleslav	(Czech Republic) AC Sparta Prague	(Czech Republic) FC Slovan Liberec
2010	(Slovakia) ŠK Slovan Bratislava	(Czech Republic) SK Slavia Prague	(Slovakia) MŠK Žilina	(Czech Republic) Bohemians 1905
2011	(Czech Republic) FC Slovan Liberec	(Czech Republic) AC Sparta Prague	(Slovakia) ŠK Slovan Bratislava	(Slovakia) MŠK Žilina
